The Swindler (Spanish: El Encantador), is a Colombian telenovela created by Caracol Televisión, from a screenplay by César Betancur, and directed by Víctor Mallarino. The series revolves around Rolando Castaño (Diego Cadavid), a man who, after finishing high school, decides to begin "negotiating" in a clandestine way to create his own company. In addition to his good physique and his way of speaking, he manages to conquer all the women in his neighborhood, which brings him many problems. The telenovela premiered on 4 February 2010, but due to its poor reception and poor premiere rating, the network decided to take it off the air three days after its premiere. It is considered some more unsuccessful telenovela in Colombian television history.

Cast 
 Diego Cadavid as Rolando Castaño
 Juliana Galvis as Luisa Solarte
 Víctor Mallarino as Father Jesús Adolfo Gaitán
 Carlos Benjumea as Augusto Giraldo
 Helena Mallarino as Sandra Linares
 Bibiana Navas as Clemencia Quijano
 Rodrigo Candamil as Marco Benedetti Pombo
 Ernesto Benjumea as Juan Ignacio Solarte
 Ana Bolena Meza as Ruth de Rendón
 Jairo Camargo as Otilio Rendón
 Estefanía Godoy as Magnolia Rendón
 Carina Cruz as Eliana Giraldo
 Andrés Parra as Evaristo Aguilar / David Colmenares
 Jacques Touckmanian as Jairo Giraldo

References

External links 
 

Colombian telenovelas
Caracol Televisión telenovelas
2010 Colombian television series debuts
2010 Colombian television series endings
2010 telenovelas
Spanish-language telenovelas
Spanish-language television shows